Saint-François-de-l'Île-d'Orléans is a municipality in the Capitale-Nationale region of Quebec, Canada, part of the L'Île-d'Orléans Regional County Municipality. The village is situated on the north-eastern tip of Orléans Island, and the municipality also includes the Madame and Ruau Islands, part of the Montmagny Archipelago.

Prior to December 20, 2003, it was known simply as Saint-François.

History
The Parish of Saint-François-de-Sales was founded in 1679, named after Francis de Sales (1567-1622) and calling to mind Francois Berthelot, Comte de Jouy and de Saint-Laurent, representative of Paris in parliament and Seigneur of Île d'Orléans (1675) at the time the parish was established. It was also known as just Saint-François, and maps of the seventeenth and eighteenth centuries would show either one or the other form. In 1845, the Parish Municipality of Saint-François-Isle-d'Orléans was formed, but abolished in 1847 when it became part of the County Municipality. In 1852, the local post office opened. In 1855, the parish municipality was reestablished.

In 2003, the Parish Municipality of Saint-François changed its statutes and was renamed to the Municipality of Saint-François-de-l'Île-d'Orléans.

Demographics

Population

Language

Local government
List of former mayors:

 Yoland Dion (2001–2009)
 Lina Labbé (2009–present)

See also
 Chenal de l'Île d'Orléans
 Île d'Orléans
 List of municipalities in Quebec

References

External links

 Île d'Orléans - Saint-François-de-l'Île-d'Orléans portrait

Incorporated places in Capitale-Nationale
Municipalities in Quebec
L'Île-d'Orléans Regional County Municipality